Film School Rejects is an American blog devoted to movie reviews, interviews, film industry news, and feature commentary. It was founded by Neil Miller in February 2006.

The site was nominated for Best News Blog by Total Film magazine and named one of the 50 best blogs for filmmakers by MovieMaker magazine. Its weekly podcast, Reject Radio, was voted as the fourth best podcast for movie fans by Movies.com.

Film School Rejects and its contributors have been featured and quoted in regional and national media outlets, including The New York Times, CNN, the Los Angeles Times, Mashable, and American Public Media. The site's April Fools' Day pranks have been covered on MTV, Fandango, and BuzzFeed.

Awards and recognitions
 #4 Best Podcast for Movie Fans – Movies.com, 2012
 #3 Best Movie Blog – BlogRank, 2012
50 Best Blogs for Filmmakers – MovieMaker magazine, 2010
Best News Blog (nominated) – Total Film, 2010
Site of the Week – AMC, 2008

References

External links 
 Film School Rejects
 Movie Journals
 Reject Radio
 LinkedIn 
American film websites
Internet properties established in 2006